KNAT-TV (channel 23) is a religious television station in Albuquerque, New Mexico, United States, owned and operated by the Trinity Broadcasting Network (TBN). The station's studios are located on Coors Boulevard in northwestern Albuquerque, and its transmitter is located on Sandia Crest.

History

KMXN-TV
Channel 23 began broadcasting as KMXN-TV on August 10, 1975. It was owned by Spanish Television of New Mexico, headed by state senator Odis Echols, and affiliated with the Spanish International Network, broadcasting from a transmitter atop the Western Bank Building.

Problems emerged with the station's management more than a year after it began operations. At the start of 1977, Herbert Taylor, a former officer of Spanish Television of New Mexico, sued Echols, fellow state senator C. B. Trujillo of Taos, and John Aragon, stockholder and president of New Mexico Highlands University, alleging that the three were using KMXN-TV to provide advertising kickbacks and for other political purposes. The First National Bank sued the station in December 1977, claiming it had defaulted on a $67,500 loan made in March 1976; by that time, Echols had stepped down.

Channel 23 also began to branch out beyond Spanish-language shows. When ABC affiliate KOAT-TV decided not to air Monday Night Baseball, KMXN-TV stepped in to carry it instead; the station then added high school football games.

KLKK-TV
In 1978, Eddie Peña began buying out the partners of Spanish Television of New Mexico. Peña was granted a construction permit the next year to move the transmitter from downtown to Sandia Crest, the main tower site for the Albuquerque area.

Peña also prepared a total relaunch of channel 23's programming. The station shifted to an English-language independent—New Mexico's first—on May 19, 1980, and took on the call letters KLKK-TV. As part of the changes, channel 23 disaffiliated from SIN, which Peña blamed for providing Latin American programming that was not well received in the Albuquerque market. Local productions included pre-existing shows from the Hispanic Chamber of Commerce that had aired on KMXN-TV, as well as Pueblo Speaks, focusing on Native American issues, and a live call-in show. SIN would not be gone from Albuquerque for long, as a translator carrying the network began broadcasting in August.

Not long after the relaunch, Peña began seeking buyers. Rumors circulated as early as the spring of 1981 that channel 23 would be sold. When fired general manager Milt Ledet sued the station for breach of contract at year's end, he revealed that a sale was near, and that he was entitled to two percent of the proceeds. While a $7 million purchase by Malcolm Glazer was reported, it was another buyer that would win out in April: Carson Communications Corporation. A star-studded consortium headed by Johnny Carson and with Neil Simon, David Letterman, Joan Rivers and Paul Anka as other investors, Carson Communications acquired the station and its programming contracts for a total of $3.6 million.

KNAT
After a brief period of silence during the transition, channel 23 emerged under Carson ownership as KNAT on August 9, 1982. The station made an early and aggressive push to court advertisers. Carson hosted some at a gala event in Las Vegas, where his company also owned VHF independent KVVU-TV, while the entertainer also briefly appeared in promotional advertisements. That stopped when the general manager of Albuquerque's NBC affiliate, KOB-TV, complained to the network; to make amends, Carson cut several promotions for The Tonight Show and KOB-TV's late newscasts.

When Peña had flipped KMXN-TV to KLKK-TV in 1980, it was the first independent television station in the Albuquerque market. A year later, competition emerged when KGSW-TV channel 14 signed on; a year after Carson took over, the two independents were tied at the bottom of the market ratings. After KNAT relaunched, two more independent stations piled into a crowded market: KNMZ-TV on channel 2 and Santa Febased KCHF on channel 11. As advertising revenues doubled, program costs increased sixfold due to competition between the independent stations.

On April 25, 1985, it was announced that KNAT would go dark on April 27, though it said two buyers were in the process of scouting out the station. The ownership group had changed its name from Carson Communications Corporation to Albuquerque Broadcasting Corporation, removing any mention of the host, after selling KVVU-TV the year prior. General manager Dave Cavileer cited the failure of ownership to market the station and said that "what they paid for programming broke their backs". Competing station executives claimed that, unwilling to provoke Carson's ire, syndicators let the station slide for months without paying fees to purchase programming. Channel 23 ended up on the air several more days while sale talks continued—airing music videos, as most of the other programming had already been returned—however, the station went off the air at midnight on May 1.

It was more than six months after the station went dark that a buyer finally emerged for channel 23: the Trinity Broadcasting Network, which purchased KNAT for $2.25 million. The station returned to the air with TBN programming on December 17.

Subchannels

KNAT-TV shut down its analog signal, over UHF channel 23, on that date. The station's digital signal remained on its pre-transition UHF channel 24. Through the use of PSIP, digital television receivers display the station's virtual channel as its former UHF analog channel 23.

References

External links 
Official website

Trinity Broadcasting Network affiliates
Television channels and stations established in 1975
NAT-TV
Mass media in Albuquerque, New Mexico
1975 establishments in New Mexico